A Bomb for a Dictator or The Fanatics (French: Les fanatiques) is a 1957 French thriller film directed by Alex Joffé and starring Pierre Fresnay, Michel Auclair and Tilda Thamar.   It was shot at the Boulogne Studios in Paris and on location at Nice Airport. The film's sets were designed by the art director Jacques Paris.

Synopsis
While a tyrannical South American dictator is visiting Europe a group of revolutionaries plan to assassinate his private plane. However, when it turns out he has changed his plans and will be flying back on a commercial flight they have to do decide whether to carry on with their plans even though it will lead to the deaths of the other passengers, or let him return to seek revenge on the plotters.

Cast
 Pierre Fresnay as Luis Vargas
 Michel Auclair as Franco Géron
 Françoise Fabian as Mme. Lambert
 Grégoire Aslan as 	Général Ribera
 Tilda Thamar as Juana Ribera
 Betty Schneider as 	Lili
 Pascal Alexandre as 	François
 José Lewgoy as 	Ramirez

 Pierre Tabard as 	Savelli 
 René Hell as Coti
 Gregori Chmara as the inquisitive passenger

References

Bibliography 
 Dalle Vacche, Angela . André Bazin's Film Theory: Art, Science, Religion. Oxford University Press, 2020.
 Katz, Ephraim. The Film Encyclopedia. Crowell, 1979.
 Oscherwitz, Dayna & Higgins, MaryEllen. The A to Z of French Cinema. Scarecrow Press, 2009.

External links 
 

1957 films
French thriller films
1950s thriller films
1950s French-language films
Films directed by Alex Joffé
Films shot in Nice
Pathé films
Films shot at Boulogne Studios
1950s French films